The Australian women's cricket team toured England and Ireland in July and August 1998. The matches against England women's cricket team were played for the Women's Ashes, which Australia were defending. Australia won the ODI series 5–0, whilst all three Test matches were drawn, meaning that Australia retained the Ashes. During their tour of England, Australia played three ODIs against Ireland, winning the series 3–0.

Tour of England

Squads

Tour matches

50-over match: England Under-21s v Australia

50-over match: South of England v Australia

50-over match: North of England v Australia

3-day match: England A v Australia

3-day match: Women's Cricket Association President's XI v Australia

WODI Series

1st ODI

2nd ODI

3rd ODI

4th ODI

5th ODI

Test series

1st Test

2nd Test

3rd Test

Tour of Ireland

Squads

WODI Series

1st ODI

2nd ODI

3rd ODI

References

External links
Australia Women tour of England 1998 from Cricinfo
Australia Women tour of Ireland 1998 from Cricinfo

The Women's Ashes
1998 in women's cricket
Women's cricket tours of England
Australia women's national cricket team tours